Aviation is a painting by Rufino Tamayo, dating 1934, its technique is gouache on paper. This painting is part of the collection of Latin American Artists of Museo Soumaya.

Description 

The composition is about the first airplane that managed to fly. In the foreground it is possible to see three male figures. The Wright brothers, Orville and Wilbur appear on the right side, they were two American inventors. On the left side there is Brazilian Alberto Santos-Dumont.

It is still debated who between these three characters was the first  who managed to fly.

“I am interested in Men, Man is my subject, Man who is creator of all scientific and technological wonders. To me that is the most important thing in existence” mentioned the artist.

The painting was exhibited at the Galería de Arte Mexicano (GAM) [Mexican Art Gallery] during the Exhibition of Paintings Rufino Tamayo in 1935 and The Dallas Museum of Art (DMA) in Three Contemporary Mexican Artists in 1948, exhibition by Diego Rivera, David Alfaro Siqueiros and Rufino Tamayo.

References

Bibliography
 Interpreter of the Southwest, Jerry Bywaters, at SMU's Meadows Museum of Art, November 30, 2007 - February 24, 2008

1934 paintings
Paintings by Rufino Tamayo
Works about aviators
Aviation art